The Mansion House is the official residence of the Lord Mayor of Swansea.  The Mansion House is situated in the Ffynone area of Swansea.  Today the Mansion House is used for a variety of public and private functions.

History of the Mansion House

The Mansion House was opened in 1863, when a local builder, Evan Matthew Richards built it for his family, it was then called Brooklands.  He was the Mayor of Swansea in 1855 and also 1862.  By 1880 Brooklands had been sold twice before it was purchased by the County Borough of Swansea in 1922. From 1922 to the present day it has been called the Mansion House.

References
City and County of Swansea: The Mansion House

Buildings and structures in Swansea
Houses completed in 1863
Mayors' mansions in the United Kingdom